Ron Barkwell (born December 14, 1946) is a former ice hockey centre who was drafted 1st (9th overall) by the Detroit Red Wings, and played in the National Hockey League.

Playing career
Barkwell starting play in his hometown of Moose Jaw with the Moose Jaw Canucks of the TBJHL. He was soon moved to the Flin Flon Bombers of the MJHL where he was a proficient at both centre and right wing. The Detroit Red Wings took a gamble by selecting Barkwell with their first pick in the 1967 NHL Entry Draft. The Wings hoped that Barkwell would continue to develop and become an active member of the organization. However, Barkwell would never play in the NHL. He joined the Johnstown Jets of the Eastern Hockey League in 1967 and only put up 8 points in 21 games. The following season he joined the Port Huron Flags of the International Hockey League and only put up 3 points in 18 games. He was quickly downgraded to the WIHL, where he joined the Nelson Maple Leafs. He continued to disappoint and was dropped after the 1968–69 season. Barkwell would retire from hockey, having never found a way to excel in the higher leagues.

External links
 
 Ron's Bio on Hockey Draft Central.com

1946 births
Canadian ice hockey centres
Detroit Red Wings draft picks
Flin Flon Bombers players
Sportspeople from Moose Jaw
Living people
National Hockey League first-round draft picks
Ice hockey people from Saskatchewan